Álvaro Semedo Vaz (born 2 April 1986 in Santiago), known as Tuga, is a Cape Verdean footballer who played as a winger.

References

1986 births
Living people
People from Santiago, Cape Verde
Cape Verdean footballers
Association football wingers
Liga Portugal 2 players
Segunda Divisão players
Real S.C. players
G.D. Estoril Praia players
Vitória S.C. players
G.D. Chaves players
Odivelas F.C. players
GD Beira-Mar players
Atlético Clube de Portugal players
C.D. Mafra players
C.D. Fátima players
Cape Verdean expatriate footballers
Expatriate footballers in Portugal
Cape Verdean expatriate sportspeople in Portugal